Sir Benjamin Chilley Campbell Pine (1809–1891) was at various times administrator of Natal, the Gold Coast, Antigua, the Leeward Islands and Western Australia.

Life
Born in 1809 in London, Benjamin Pine was educated in Brighton and at Trinity College, Cambridge. He became a career officer in the British Colonial Service.  From 1850 to 1855, he was Lieutenant-Governor of Natal Colony, and from March 1857 until 17 April 1858 was Governor of the Gold Coast.

On 30 July 1868, Pine was appointed by letters patent to the position of Governor of Western Australia.  Shortly afterwards, however, a vacancy occurred for the position of Governor of the Leeward Islands, and it was decided that he should fill that position instead.  He never arrived in Western Australia, and six months passed before the colony received news that he would not be coming.

Pine served as Governor of the Leeward Islands from  1869 until 1871.  His title then became Governor of Antigua until 1873, but the Leeward Islands continued under his governorship.  He died in 1891.

The city of Pinetown, in modern-day KwaZulu-Natal, South Africa, is named after him.

There is also a Primary school called Benjamin Pine Primary School named after him in Pinetown as well as the Pinetown High Schools (Boys and Girls) Honouring his name by the Pine Cones on the Badges.

He is buried on the eastern side of Highgate Cemetery. His grave (no.29309) has no headstone or marker.

Status as Governor of Western Australia
In Burt (1996), Sir Francis Burt, who was a lawyer, a judge and himself a former Governor of Western Australia, analysed the question whether Pine should be considered to have served as Governor of Western Australia.  He concluded that the appointment by letters patent, together with the publication of that appointment in the newspapers of the colony, legally implied that Pine was Governor of Western Australia, even though he never arrived at the colony and was never sworn in.

The person who actually administered the colony during the period of Pine's formal tenure (2 November 1868–29 September 1869) was Lieut Col John Bruce.

References

|-

1809 births
1891 deaths
Burials at Highgate Cemetery
Governors of the Gold Coast (British colony)
Governors of Western Australia
Governors of the Leeward Islands
History of South Africa
Alumni of Trinity College, Cambridge
Governors of Natal
Colony of Western Australia people
Governors of British Saint Christopher
Governors of Antigua and Barbuda